The 1986 Toronto Indoor (also known as the Corel North American Indoor for sponsorship reasons) was a men's tennis tournament played on indoor carpet courts in Toronto, Ontario, Canada that was part of the 1986 Nabisco Grand Prix. It was the second edition of the tournament and was held from February 3 through February 9, 1986. First-seeded Joakim Nyström won the singles title.

Finals

Singles

 Joakim Nyström defeated  Milan Šrejber, 6–1, 6–4
 It was Nyström's 1st singles title of the year and the 8th of his career.

Doubles

 Wojtek Fibak /  Joakim Nyström defeated  Christo Steyn /  Danie Visser, 6–3, 7–6

References

External links
 ITF tournament edition details

Toronto Indoor
Toronto Indoor